Historic Oakwood is a neighborhood in downtown Raleigh, North Carolina, United States, on the National Register of Historic Places, and known for its Historic Oakwood Cemetery, its many Victorian houses and its location close to the Mordecai Plantation Manor. Located near the  State Capitol and St. Augustine's Chapel, during the 19th century Historic Oakwood was home to prominent members of Raleigh's society. It is North Carolina's largest, intact 19th Century residential neighborhood and Raleigh's earliest white middle-class suburb. Unlike later suburbs, it developed lot-by-lot over time, instead of by platted sections. Its Victorian-era architectural styles include Second Empire, Queen Anne, and Italianate. Later infill brought the bungalow, the American Foursquare, American Craftsman style, and the Minimal Traditional house to the area.

Oakwood is also known for its Christmas Candlelight Tour, which opens private historic residences to the public, and the Garden Tour, which allows the public to see the vast gardens worked on by the Oakwood Gardening Club.

Oakwood was listed on the National Register of Historic Places in 1974, with additions made in 1987, 1988, and 1989. It is also one of six local historic overlay districts (HOD). Several Oakwood residences are also individually recognized as Local Historic Landmarks.

Gallery

See also
Neuse River
Mordecai House
Battle of Morrisville
Historic Oakwood Cemetery

References

External links

 Oakwood Historic Overlay District, RHDC
 National Register Historic Districts in Raleigh, North Carolina, RHDC
 Historic Oakwood

Second Empire architecture in North Carolina
Queen Anne architecture in North Carolina
Neoclassical architecture in North Carolina
Victorian architecture in North Carolina
Neighborhoods in Raleigh, North Carolina
Tourist attractions in Raleigh, North Carolina
Historic mansion districts
National Register of Historic Places in Raleigh, North Carolina
Historic districts on the National Register of Historic Places in North Carolina